Linda Patricia Pérez López (born 9 July 1998) is a Venezuelan Paralympic athlete who competes in sprinting events at international elite events. She is a Parapan American Games silver medalist and Summer Paralympics gold medalist.  

Perez competed at the 2019 Parapan American Games where she won the silver medal at the 400m T11 event. She competed at the 2020 Summer Paralympics, winning the gold medal at the women's 100m event.

Perez is the twin sister of Alejandra Paola Pérez López who is also an athlete.

References

1998 births
Living people
Sportspeople from Maracaibo
Paralympic athletes of Venezuela
Venezuelan female sprinters
Medalists at the 2019 Parapan American Games
Athletes (track and field) at the 2020 Summer Paralympics
Medalists at the 2020 Summer Paralympics
Paralympic gold medalists for Venezuela
Paralympic medalists in athletics (track and field)
Twin sportspeople
Venezuelan twins
21st-century Venezuelan women